Mobley is a surname. Notable people with the surname include:

Anne Ramsey (1929–1988), American actress born Anne Mobley
Annie Mobley (born 1942), American politician
Carlton Mobley (1906–1981), American jurist and politician
Cuttino Mobley (born 1975), American former National Basketball Association player
Eric Mobley (1970–2021), American basketball player
Ethel Mobley (1914–1984), American race car driver, tied as the second female NASCAR driver
Evan Mobley (born 2001), American basketball player
Frank Mobley (1868–1956), English footballer
Frank Harry Mobley (1870–1920), Canadian politician
Hank Mobley (1930–1986), American hard bop and soul jazz tenor saxophonist and composer
Isaiah Mobley (born 1999), American basketball player
John Mobley (born 1973), American football player
Mary Ann Mobley (1937–2014), American actress and former Miss America
Orson Mobley (born 1963), American former National Football League player
Roger Mobley (born 1949), American child actor
Russ Mobley (1933–2018), American educator and politician
Sharif Mobley (born 1984), American suspected terrorist arrested in 2010
Stephen Anthony Mobley (1965–2005), American convicted murderer
Singor Mobley (born 1972), American former Canadian Football League linebacker
Vic Mobley (born 1943), English former footballer
Wendell Mobley, American country music songwriter